The 19th Legislative Assembly of Saskatchewan was elected in the Saskatchewan general election held in October 1978. The assembly sat from February 22, 1979, to March 29, 1982. The New Democratic Party (NDP) led by Allan Blakeney formed the government. The Progressive Conservative Party led by Richard Collver formed the official opposition. Eric Berntson replaced Collver as party leader in 1979.

John Edward Brockelbank served as speaker for the assembly.

Members of the Assembly 
The following members were elected to the assembly in 1978:

Notes:

Party Standings 

Notes:

By-elections 
By-elections were held to replace members for various reasons:

Notes:

References 

Terms of the Saskatchewan Legislature